Garth Wood (born 13 June 1978) is an Australian professional boxer and former professional rugby league footballer. Wood won the 2009/2010 Contender Boxing Series. He played rugby league for the South Sydney Rabbitohs and the Balmain Tigers in the NRL.

Background
Wood was born in Sydney.

Garth is the brother of Balmain Tigers, Sydney Roosters and Warrington Wolves utility Nathan Wood and the son of Newtown, Norths and Souths halfback Barry Wood.

Rugby league career
A Souths junior Wood seemed destined to play the game as father, Barry Wood, was a halfback for the club and his brother, Nathan, also a Souths junior, signed and played for fellow foundation club Balmain Tigers in 1993. Wood debuted for Souths at 17 years of age, but his rugby league career was fledging as he only played nine games for Souths and Balmain between 1997 and 1999, before four gap where he rejoined the Rabbitohs in 2004 and appeared in a further 16 games. After this Wood decided to make a career out of boxing like fellow league converts Anthony Mundine and Solomon Haumono. Wood describes the area he grew up in was a factor in his career path "When I was growing up, it was a tough area: you either played footy or fought".

Boxing career
In only his eighth professional bout, on 11 January 2010 Wood became the first winner of The Contender Australia by defeating Kariz Kariuki by a split points decision after seven rounds. The win earned him $25,000 and a fight with "The Man" Mundine. Wood overcame Victor Oganov in the five round semi-final by a majority decision and stopped Israel Kani in the second round of the quarter-finals to reach the final against Kariuki. Throughout the filming of The Contender Australia Wood was rated a Super Middleweight along with all the other contestants.
   
On 8 December 2010 Wood defeated Anthony Mundine by knockout at the Acer Arena. Wood was aggressive from round 1, attempting to rough up and lure Mundine into a brawl, in the fifth round it was a left hook to the jaw that dropped Mundine while he was bending his body sideways and considerably low. Wood had to drop weight to Middleweight for the fight after the Mundine camp offered $100,000 as a sweetener. They originally wanted Wood to drop to a Junior Middleweight, but Wood refused. Wood lost to Mundine in a rematch via a points decision.

Television career
Wood is a co-anchor of Fight Call Out on Fox Sports

Professional Boxing Record

References

External links 

 

 

1978 births
Living people
Australian male boxers
Australian rugby league players
Balmain Tigers players
Boxers from Sydney
Reality show winners
Rugby league fullbacks
Rugby league players from Sydney
Rugby league wingers
South Sydney Rabbitohs players
Super-middleweight boxers
The Contender (TV series) participants